Kiho may refer to:

 Kiho-tumu, the supreme god in the mythology of the Tuamotu archipelago
 Kihō, Mie, a town in Japan
 In the Legend of the Five Rings Collectible Card Game, kiho cards are played as actions, but generate spell effects.  Kiho nearly always require a shugenja or monk (sometimes specifically one or the other) to bow as part of the cost of playing the card
 In the Legend of the Five Rings Role-Playing Game, kiho are complex martial arts techniques learned by monks and sometimes shugenja that have some extraordinary or supernatural effect

People with the given name
, Japanese women's basketball player

Japanese feminine given names